Take the Heat off Me is the debut album by Euro-Caribbean group Boney M. The album became a major seller in Europe, specifically in the Nordic countries (number 1 in Sweden and Finland, number 2 in Norway), but in the US the album just missed the album chart. Tracks include the hits "Daddy Cool" (number 1 in eight European countries, number 65 on the Billboard Hot 100), "Sunny" (top 5 in many European countries) and the debut single "Baby Do You Wanna Bump".

Additional information
Producer Frank Farian was in a hurry to capitalize on the sudden success of "Daddy Cool" and put together the first Boney M. album quickly, made possible by the use of cover versions and by reusing already existing recordings.

While "Baby Do You Wanna Bump" was reworked from Prince Buster's "Al Capone" (although credited to Farian's alias 'Zambi'), "Sunny", "No Woman No Cry" and "Fever" are cover versions of well-known tracks, albeit rearranged. The title track "Take the Heat off Me" is also a cover, of the 1974 Italian hit "Nessuno mai" ("No one ever") by Italian artist Marcella Bella.

Versions of three tracks had previously been released by another Farian produced artist Gilla in German, "Take the Heat off Me" ("Mir ist kein weg zu weit"), "Lovin' or Leavin'" ("Lieben und frei sein") and the UK/US exclusive "Help, Help" ("Ich brenne"), the last of which Gilla also recorded in English. Gilla would furthermore record German versions of "Sunny" and "No Woman No Cry", using the same backing tracks. The B-side of the single "Sunny", the non-album track "New York City", also recycles Gilla, in fact two of her tracks: "Tu Es" (English version "Why Don't You Do It") and "Ich brenne" ("Help, Help!"). "Got a Man on My Mind" was rewritten from Farian's "Am Samstagabend", the B-side of his 1976 hit single "Rocky".

"Daddy Cool" is in fact the only truly original track on the album.

Track listing
Side A
"Daddy Cool" (Frank Farian, George Reyam (Hans-Jörg Mayer)) – 3:29
"Take the Heat off Me" (Bigazzi, Gianni Bella) – 4:47
"Sunny" (Bobby Hebb) – 4:03
"Baby Do You Wanna Bump" (Zambi (Frank Farian)) – 6:53

Side B
"No Woman No Cry" (Vincent Ford, Bob Marley) – 4:59
"Fever" (Eddie Cooley, John Davenport) – 4:00
"Got a Man on My Mind" (Frank Farian, Fred Jay) – 3:25
"Lovin' or Leavin'" (Frank Farian, Fred Jay) – 4:29

Personnel
Musicians
 Liz Mitchell – lead vocals (tracks A3, B1, B2 & B3), backing vocals
 Marcia Barrett – lead vocals (tracks A2 & B4), backing vocals
 Frank Farian – lead vocals (tracks A1 & A4), backing vocals
 The Rhythm Machine – musicians
 Gary Unwin – bass guitar
 Keith Forsey – drums
 Nick Woodland – guitar
 Thor Baldursson – keyboards

Production
 Frank Farian – producer
 Steven Hammer (Stefan Klinkhammer) – arranger, conductor
 Recorded at Union Studios, Munich and Europasound Studios, Frankfurt

Charts

Weekly charts

Year-end charts

Certifications

Reissued
 1994: CD, BMG, 74321 21271 2
 2007: CD, Sony BMG Music Entertainment, 88697082602
 2011: Boney M. Original Album Classics, 5 CD, Sony Music, 88697928702
 2017: Boney M. Complete, 9 LP, Sony Music, 88985406971

References

External links
 Rate Your Music, detailed discography
 

1976 debut albums
Boney M. albums
Albums produced by Frank Farian
Atlantic Records albums
Hansa Records albums